In mathematics, the characteristic equation (or auxiliary equation) is an algebraic equation of degree  upon which depends the solution of a given th-order differential equation or difference equation. The characteristic equation can only be formed when the differential or difference equation is linear and homogeneous, and has constant coefficients.

will have a characteristic equation of the form

whose solutions  are the roots from which the general solution can be formed.  Analogously, a linear difference equation of the form

has characteristic equation

discussed in more detail at Linear recurrence with constant coefficients#Solution to homogeneous case.

The characteristic roots (roots of the characteristic equation) also provide qualitative information about the behavior of the variable whose evolution is described by the dynamic equation. For a differential equation parameterized on time, the variable's evolution is stable if and only if the real part of each root is negative. For difference equations, there is stability if and only if the modulus of each root is less than 1. For both types of equation, persistent fluctuations occur if there is at least one pair of complex roots.

The method of integrating linear ordinary differential equations with constant coefficients was discovered by Leonhard Euler, who found that the solutions depended on an algebraic 'characteristic' equation.  The qualities of the Euler's characteristic equation were later considered in greater detail by French mathematicians Augustin-Louis Cauchy and Gaspard Monge.

Derivation 

Starting with a linear homogeneous differential equation with constant coefficients ,

This results from the fact that the derivative of the exponential function  is a multiple of itself.

Since  can never equal zero, it can be divided out, giving the characteristic equation

By solving for the roots, in this characteristic equation, one can find the general solution to the differential equation.

Formation of the general solution 
Solving the characteristic equation for its roots, allows one to find the general solution of the differential equation. The roots may be real or complex, as well as distinct or repeated.

Example
The linear homogeneous differential equation with constant coefficients
 
has the characteristic equation

By factoring the characteristic equation into

This corresponds to the real-valued general solution

with constants .

Distinct real roots 
The superposition principle for linear homogeneous differential equations says that if  are  linearly independent solutions to a particular differential equation, then  is also a solution for all values .  Therefore, if the characteristic equation has distinct real roots , then a general solution will be of the form

Repeated real roots 
If the characteristic equation has a root  that is repeated  times, then it is clear that  is at least one solution.  However, this solution lacks linearly independent solutions from the other  roots.  Since  has multiplicity , the differential equation can be factored into

The fact that  is one solution allows one to presume that the general solution may be of the form , where  is a function to be determined.  Substituting  gives

when .  By applying this fact  times, it follows that

By dividing out , it can be seen that

Complex roots 
By Euler's formula, which states that , this solution can be rewritten as follows:

(Indeed, since  is real,  must be imaginary or zero and  must be real, in order for both terms after the last equals sign to be real.)

For example, if , then the particular solution  is formed. Thus by the superposition principle for linear homogeneous differential equations, a second-order differential equation having complex roots  will result in the following general solution:

This analysis also applies to the parts of the solutions of a higher-order differential equation whose characteristic equation involves non-real complex conjugate roots.

See also
 Characteristic polynomial

References 

Ordinary differential equations